The 2011 The Bahamas Women's Open was a professional tennis tournament played on hard courts. It was part of the 2011 ITF Women's Circuit. It took place in Nassau, Bahamas between 14 and 20 March 2011.

Singles entrants

Seeds

 Rankings are as of March 7, 2010.

Other entrants
The following players received wildcards into the singles main draw:
  Timea Bacsinszky 
  Petra Kvitová 
  Sabine Lisicki 
  Alexandra Stevenson

The following players received entry from the qualifying draw:
  Sophie Ferguson
  Han Xinyun
  Olga Savchuk
  Heather Watson

Champions

Singles

 Anastasiya Yakimova def.  Angelique Kerber, 6–3, 6–2

Doubles

 Natalie Grandin /  Vladimíra Uhlířová def.  Raquel Kops-Jones /  Abigail Spears, 6–4, 6–2

External links
Official Website
ITF Search

The Bahamas Women's Open
Hard court tennis tournaments